Roger Green may refer to:

Roger Green (archaeologist) (1932–2009), American archaeologist
Roger Green (rugby league) (born before 1915), Welsh footballer
Roger Green (sailor)
Roger L. Green (born 1949), American politician
Roger Lancelyn Green (1918–1987), English writer

Fictional characters
Roger Green (EastEnders), a character on EastEnders

See also
Roger Greene (disambiguation)
Matthew Roger Green (born 1970), British Liberal Democrat
Green (surname)